Tommy Wirtanen (born 19 January 1983) is a Finnish former footballer. He usually played as a winger and is well known for his great pace.

Career

IFK Mariehamn
Before joining Örebro SK, Wirtanen played for IFK Mariehamn in his native Finland. It's also the only other club he has represented.
While at IFK Mariehamn, Wirtanen made 180 first team appearances and scored 15 goals from 2000 to 2008. He was a part of the team that promoted IFK Mariehamn to the Finnish First Division in 2003 and the following season all the way to the Premier Division.

Örebro SK
On 19 December 2008 it was made official that Wirtanen would join Swedish Örebro SK on a two-year-contract. Wirtanen is one of three Finns currently at Örebro, the other ones being Roni Porokara and Fredrik Nordback.

References

External links
 
 Wirtanen scoring a phenomenal goal in an indoor pre season match against HJK Helsinki
 Wirtanen's profile on Veikkausliiga.com 
 Wirtanen's profile on Örebro's website 

1983 births
Living people
People from Mariehamn
Finnish footballers
Veikkausliiga players
IFK Mariehamn players
Örebro SK players
Allsvenskan players
Swedish-speaking Finns
Association football forwards
Association football wingers
Finnish expatriate footballers
Finnish expatriate sportspeople in Sweden
Expatriate footballers in Sweden
Sportspeople from Åland